Sapphire Stagg is a fictional character appearing in American comic books published by DC Comics. She is the wealthy socialite daughter of industrialist Simon Stagg and is the long term love interest of the superhero Metamorpho.

Fictional character biography
Sapphire Stagg meets and falls in love with one of Stagg's former employees, Rex Mason, and remains with him  when he began adventuring as the super-hero Metamorpho. Simon Stagg greatly disapproves of Sapphire's devotion to Mason and  schemes to break them apart (usually by putting Metamorpho into harm's way). Sapphire and Rex eventually marry and have a son together named Joey. Joey inherits the transmutative properties of his father, but can use these abilities to affect the chemical properties of other objects as well.

For a time, Sapphire believes that Metamorpho has died, and her father arranges for her to marry his Neanderthal assistant named Java. Although she remains loyal to Java, her heart always belongs to Rex. Eventually, Sapphire discovers that Metamorpho is alive and working in Paris as a member of Justice League Europe. The two have since reunited.

Birds of Prey
Java comes upon Black Canary while searching for help for Sapphire. His story is that Sapphire and Joey, Metamorpho's son, has been caught in a lab explosion and merged into a single energy being who was taking revenge upon Simon Stagg's former colleagues. It is revealed that not only were Sapphire and Joey merged, but so was Simon. It is he who is directing the revenge. Black Canary realizes that Java is actually Metamorpho, somehow affected to believe he is Java. The three are separated once more; Simon claims to have been overcome by the energy itself and unable to control his actions. As the comic ends, he steps away from the joyous family reunion to check on a growing clone of Java.

The New 52
In 2011, "The New 52" rebooted the DC universe. Sapphire Stagg's history and her love for Rex Mason is the same.

DC Rebirth
In 2016, DC Comics implemented another relaunch of its books called "DC Rebirth", which restored its continuity to a form much as it was prior to "The New 52". Sapphire was present when Simon Stagg had opened a portal to the Dark Multiverse and is trying to close it with Metamorpho who was transmuted to Nth Metal. She is present when Mister Terrific, Plastic Man, Metamorpho, and Phantom Girl return from the Dark Multiverse. Metamorpho and Sapphire later discuss the strains on their relationship.

During the "Endless Winter" storyline, Sapphire Stagg is revealed to have a brother named Sebastian.

Other versions
Sapphire Stagg appears in the Elseworlds story The Nail.

In other media
Sapphire Stagg appears in the Justice League episode "Metamorphosis", voiced by Danica McKellar. Sapphire Stagg meets Rex Mason through his employment at Stagg Industries, which leads to an affair between the like-minded, passionate individuals. They keep their relationship a secret from her father until she tells him that she was going with Rex to Chicago. Stagg decides to make Mason the test subject for his Metamorpho project to eliminate him from his daughter's life. His plan fails however, as Sapphire still loves Rex after his transformation.

Sapphire Stagg appears in the Beware the Batman episode "Toxic", voiced by Emmanuelle Chriqui. Simon Stagg disapproves of Sapphire's relationship with the security guard Rex Mason and believes that he had bred his daughter to be better. Donning a ski mask, Simon Stagg sets off an alarm and lures Rex Mason into the lab in "Project Metamorpho" where he traps him inside and exposes him to the chemicals. Upon Batman's arrival, Simon Stagg flees the lab and deletes incriminating security footage. Batman eventually learns the truth and tells everything to Metamorpho in order to lure him back to Stagg Industries so that he can be cured. Simon Stagg allows Batman access to Project Metamorpho where the antidote did not work. After Metamorpho vanishes, Simon Stagg attempts to pin the blame of Metamorpho's death on Batman, who shows Sapphire Stagg the footage of her father's role in Metamorpho's creation. Batman then leaves with plans to leave the incriminating footage of Simon Stagg's role in Metamorpho's creation to the police. In "Monsters", Batman suspects Simon Stagg of hiring and providing thugs with armor and weapons to drive people out of Old Gotham and buy the territory for profit. He visits Simon Stagg in his cell at Blackgate Penitentiary, but Stagg denies being involved in the scheme. The real culprit is later revealed to be Sapphire, who seeks to impress her father. Batman threatens her to stop while withholding Rex's survival from her.

References

Fictional female businesspeople
Comics characters introduced in 1965
Characters created by Bob Haney
DC Comics female characters